John Keller (18 February 1910 – 5 July 1980) was a Canadian boxer. He competed in the men's featherweight event at the 1932 Summer Olympics.

References

1910 births
1980 deaths
Canadian male boxers
Olympic boxers of Canada
Boxers at the 1932 Summer Olympics
Place of birth missing
Commonwealth Games medallists in boxing
Boxers at the 1930 British Empire Games
Commonwealth Games bronze medallists for Canada
Featherweight boxers
Medallists at the 1930 British Empire Games